Fandango is a 1949 French musical film directed by Emil E. Reinert and starring Luis Mariano, Ludmilla Tchérina and Annette Poivre.

It was shot at the Victorine Studios in Nice. The film's sets were designed by the art director Jean Douarinou.

Synopsis
In the Basque Country two friends are in love with the woman of an inn they frequent. Things are thrown into doubt when one of them is offered the chance to launch a singing career in Paris.

Cast
 Luis Mariano as José 
 Ludmilla Tchérina as Angélica  
 Raymond Bussières as François  
 Annette Poivre as Annette  
 Edmond Audran as Paul 
 Fernand Rauzéna as M. Carlo  
 Georgette Tissier as La mariée 
 Jean Tissier as M. Fleur  
 Lucien Callamand as Le beau-père  
 Robert Dalban as L'inspecteur  
 Claire Gérard as La grand-mère  
 Hennery as Bouffartigue  
 Liliane Lesaffre as Une invitée  
 Jean-François Martial as L'ingénieur  
 Jean Gabert 
 Gary Garland 
 Lucette Mounier

References

Bibliography 
 Creekmur, Corey & Mokdad, Linda. The International Film Musical. Edinburgh University Press, 2012.

External links 
 

1949 films
1949 musical films
French musical films
1940s French-language films
Films directed by Emil-Edwin Reinert
Films set in Spain
French black-and-white films
1940s French films